Queendom is the second album of the Japanese rock group Show-Ya. The album was released on 1 March 1986 in Japan.

Overview
Show-Ya's second album was recorded with less external pressure than their debut album Masquerade Show and presents only songs composed and arranged by the band. The album was again mixed at Abbey Road Studios in London by Haydn Bendall.
The band shoot their first video clip for the single "Shidokenaku Emotion".

In this work the sound of the band is more identifiable and shows in many songs a powerful hard rock feel, with the strong interaction between keyboards and guitars that will become a characteristic feature of the band. However, Terada's romantic lyrics and the acerbic looks of the costumed musicians seem to pigeonhole this work as a pop-rock album, in the vein of Princess Princess similar products.

Track listing
Side one
"Broken My Heart" (Miki Nakamura, Keiko Terada) – 4:53
"Mr. J" (Miki Tsunoda, Terada) – 3:35
"In the Night" (Miki Igarashi, Terada) – 4:50
"Secret" (シークレット) (Nakamura, Terada) – 3:43
"Toki Wo Koete" (時を越えて) (Igarashi, Terada) – 5:52

Side two
"Shidokenaku Emotion" (しどけなくエモーション) (Nakamura, Reiko Yukawa) – 4:10
"Again" (Nakamura, Terada) – 4:01
"Silent Vision" (サイレント　ヴィジョン) (Nakamura, Terada) – 5:13
"Fire" (Igarashi, Terada) – 5:04
"I Can Tell You" (Nakamura) – 3:14

Personnel

Band members
Keiko Terada – vocals
Miki Igarashi – guitars
Miki Nakamura – keyboards
Satomi Senba – bass
Miki Tsunoda – drums

Production
Akira Tanaka – producer
Kinji Yoshino – co–producer
Daisuke Nakayama – engineer
Haydn Bendall – remix engineer
Takayuki Negishi – creative input
Hiroaki Takei, Yukio Taguchi – supervisors

References

External links
Show-Ya discography 
"Shidokenaku Emotion" video clip

Show-Ya albums
1986 albums
EMI Records albums
Japanese-language albums